Henri Thesingh (4 March 1903 – 8 September 1982) was a Dutch athlete. He competed in the men's high jump at the 1928 Summer Olympics.

References

1903 births
1982 deaths
Athletes (track and field) at the 1928 Summer Olympics
Dutch male high jumpers
Olympic athletes of the Netherlands
Place of birth missing